Tabanus novaescotiae is a species of Horse-fly in the family Tabanidae.

Distribution
Canada, United States.

References

Tabanidae
Insects described in 1847
Taxa named by Pierre-Justin-Marie Macquart
Diptera of North America